Mongolian highest radio antenna is a guyed mast, and the tallest structure in Mongolia. This is a radio mast with a height of 352.5 meters.

It is located in Ölgii in the west of Mongolia. The radio tower has mast lights, lit with blue lights. On it radio advertisements and the local time are written in large letters. Date of construction is unknown.

See also
Media of Mongolia
Communications in Mongolia

References

Television in Mongolia